Schistocerca shoshone, known generally as the green bird grasshopper or green valley grasshopper, is a species of bird grasshopper in the family Acrididae. It is found in North America.

References

Further reading

External links

 

Cyrtacanthacridinae
Articles created by Qbugbot
Insects described in 1873